In phonetics and linguistics the phonetic environment refers to the surrounding sounds of a target speech sound, or target phone, in a word. The phonetic environment of a phone can sometimes determine the allophonic or phonemic qualities of a sound in a given language.

For example, the English vowel 'a' /æ/ in the word 'mat' /mæt/ has the consonants /m/ preceding it and /t/ following it. In linguistic notation it is written as /m__t, where the slash can be read as "in the environment", and the underscore represents the target phone's position relative to its neighbours. The expression therefore reads "in the environment after m and before t".

See also
 Allophone
 Complementary distribution
 Contrastive distribution
 Free variation
 List of phonetics topics
 Minimal pair
 Phoneme

References

External links
 What is an environment?

Phonetics
Phonology